The Alabama version of the NWA Tri-State Tag Team Championship existed from 1971 until 1977. It was defended primarily in Alabama under the banner of NWA Tri-State Wrestling, and at times in Tennessee for NWA Mid-America. Because the championship was a professional wrestling championship, it is not won or lost competitively but instead by the decision of the bookers of a wrestling promotion. The championship was awarded after the chosen team "won" a match to maintain the illusion that professional wrestling is a competitive sport.

Title history

Footnotes

References
General references

Specific

National Wrestling Alliance championships
NWA Mid-America championships
Tag team wrestling championships
United States regional professional wrestling championships